Baroness  (née  and formerly ), was a Japanese educator, one of the first two Japanese women to attend a college, and one of the first piano teachers in Japan.

Biography 
 was born in Edo on 18 April 1862, one of the four daughters of Masuda Takayoshi, a Sado bugyō.  She was the younger sister of Masuda Takashi. When she was six years old, she experienced the Battle of Ueno, part of the Boshin War in which her father and brother supported the losing side of the Tokugawa shogunate. To keep Shige safe from imperial backlash after the war, her brother Takashi asked his friend Nagai Gen'ei, a doctor who was relocating away from Tokyo with other exiled members of the shogun's retinue, to take Shige with him. She was adopted by Nagai Gen'ei or his son Kyūtarō and was known as Nagai Shige. She studied at the temple school in her new village for three years, learning to read and write Japanese.

In November 1871 at the age of only 10 years old, Nagai Shige was among the five Japanese girls sent to the United States as part of the Iwakura Mission and was brought to the household of John Stevens Cabot Abbott. She graduated from New Haven High School. On September 19, 1878, she entered the School of Art at Vassar College under the name of Shige Nagai. She and Ōyama Sutematsu, who also enrolled at Vassar that year, were the first two Japanese women to enroll in a college. Shige studied music at Vassar for three years. She received a Certificate in Music from Vassar on June 22, 1881.

After returning to Japan in 1881, Nagai Shigeko married Uryū Sotokichi in a Christian ceremony on 1 December 1882 .

Shigeko was one Japan's first piano teachers. She was one of the founding teachers, teaching Western music, at the Tokyo Music School when it opened in 1882. She also served as a teacher at the Tokyo Women's Normal School.

Her husband Uryū Sotokichi was made a Baron for his service in Japan's navy 1894-1895 and 1904–1905, and Shigeko became a Baroness. Baroness Uryū Shigeko made a visit to the United States in 1909, attending Vassar's commencement ceremony and speaking about the education of women in Japan.

She died on 3 November 1928.

See also 
 Ōyama Sutematsu
 Tsuda Umeko
 Daughters of the Samurai: A Journey from East to West and Back

References 

1862 births
1928 deaths
Japanese educators
People of Meiji-period Japan
Members of the Iwakura Mission
Academic staff of Ochanomizu University
People from Tokyo
Vassar College alumni
Japanese women educators
19th-century Japanese women